Kara-Oy (formerly: Dolinka) is a village in Issyk-Kul Region of Kyrgyzstan. It is part of the Issyk-Kul District. Its population was 5,018 in 2021.

Population

References

Populated places in Issyk-Kul Region